John Henry Carpenter (April 24, 1928 – September 4, 1998) was an American  video equipment salesman, most widely known as the friend and accused murderer of actor Bob Crane in 1978.

Biography
Carpenter was of Native American and Spanish heritage. He was born on the Morongo Band of Mission Indians reservation where as a teenager he often earned money as a migrant worker harvesting apricots.

Carpenter served in the U.S. Army and was married twice. Following his retirement from the  Army he took a job marketing video technology, achieving expertise in that field and becoming head of the video wing of a new Japanese electronics company debuting in the United States called Sonycom, later to be known simply as Sony. John had a child, John Michael Carpenter, from his first marriage who was adopted with the last name of Merrill. John Carpenter had three grandchildren from his first marriage and six great grandchildren.

Relationship with Bob Crane
During the run of Hogan's Heroes, Richard Dawson introduced Crane to Carpenter, a regional sales manager for Sony Electronics, who often helped famous clients with video and audio equipment.  The two men struck up a friendship and began going to bars together. Crane attracted women due to his celebrity status as well as handsomeness and introduced Carpenter as his manager. Later, the two would videotape their sexual encounters with women they met.  While Crane's son Robert later insisted that all of the women were aware of the videotaping and consented to it, some, according to one source, had no idea they had been recorded until informed by Scottsdale police after Crane's murder.  Carpenter later became national sales manager at Akai, and arranged his business trips to coincide with Crane's dinner-theater touring schedule so that the two could continue seducing and videotaping women after Hogan's Heroes had run its course.

Trial
In 1994, Crane's murder case was re-opened and Carpenter was tried and eventually acquitted. As a result of the accusation, he was fired from work as National Service Manager at the electronics firm Kenwood USA. 
He always maintained his innocence, and later said he felt a huge relief after his name had been cleared. One jury member later said in an interview that the jury believed there was insufficient proof to determine Carpenter's guilt and that "you cannot prove someone guilty on speculation."

Portrayal in Auto Focus

In the 2002 biopic Auto Focus, Carpenter was played by Willem Dafoe.

References

External links

Richard Dawson interview – Richard Dawson talks about Carpenter, see Part 2, starting at 29:25.

1928 births
1998 deaths
1978 murders in the United States
American salespeople
People acquitted of murder
Native American people
American people of Spanish descent
United States Army soldiers